Shania: A Life in Eight Albums is a Canadian television movie, which premiered on CBC Television at 8pm on November 7, 2005. It is a biopic of Canadian country star Shania Twain, that was originally scheduled to air in October, but was delayed by the CBC labour dispute. The film was divided into eight chapters, each defined by its own colour code, style and symbolic album cover title.

Production and release
The role of Shania was shared between eight-year-old Reva Timbers, teen Shenae Grimes, and Meredith Henderson who plays Twain as an adult. They worked out shared mannerisms to improve continuity and all did their own singing. The film also stars Megan Follows and Eric Schweig as Twain's parents, and Gordon Tootoosis as her grandfather.

The film was directed by Jerry Ciccoritti and produced by Barna-Alper Productions.

Filming started on September 20, 2004 and mainly occurred in Sudbury. Additional filming was done in Huntsville, Timmins and Toronto. The film contained only brief footage of Timmins even though Twain grew up there. In 2004, Timmins mayor Vic Power publicly criticized the filmmakers for not producing the film in Timmins, calling it a "horrible miscarriage of justice". Nevertheless, the director was successful in recruiting cousins of Twain as extras, and more importantly he secured High Park House, where Twain lived with John Kim Bell, as a filming location. In a random case of good fortune, the current owner of the house provided the crew with a guitar Shania had left behind. Meredith Henderson played it in the film.

The film was not authorized by Twain and made without her participation. The film ends with a disclaimer stating so. Because of Twain's lack of participation, the producers were not allowed to use any of her songs, and thus relied on early bootlegs of Twain singing public domain songs.

The film was released on DVD on April 24, 2007.

Cast
 Meredith Henderson ...  Shania Twain
 Shenae Grimes ...  Eilleen Shania Twain 13-16 yrs. 
 Reva Timbers ...  Eilleen Twain 8-11 yrs. 
 Megan Follows ...  Sharon Twain 
 Eric Schweig ...  Jerry Twain 
 Lynne Cormack ...  Mary Baily 
 Darrell Dennis ...  John Kim Bell
 Gordon Tootoosis ...  Greey Twain 
 Katie Boland ...  Jill Twain, 13-24 yrs. 
 Caroline Sura ...  Carrie Anne Twain, 10-13 yrs. 
 Courtenay Betts ...  Carrie Anne Twain, 16-21 yrs. 
 Adam Cabral ...  Mark Twain, 5-8 yrs. 
 Devon Bostick ...  Mark Twain, 14 yrs. 
 Aydan James Taylor ...  Darryl Twain, 5-7 yrs 
 Chevez Ezaneh ...  Darryl Twain, 8-13 yrs. 
 Tracey Toulouse ...  Audrey 
 Diego Klattenhoff ...  Paul 
 Christopher Ralph ...  Mike 
 Grant Aldridge ...  David 
 Michael Carabine ...  Rick 
 David Dymond ...  Mike
 Jacqueline Pillon ... Lucinda

Awards
The film was nominated for two Gemini Awards in 2006. Megan Follows was nominated in the category "Best Performance by an Actress in a Featured Supporting Role in a Dramatic Program or Mini-Series". The film was also nominated in the category "Best Sound in a Dramatic Program". It also won the DGC Craft Award for "Outstanding Sound Editing - Television Movie/Mini-Series" that same year.

References

External links
http://www.shaniasplace.com/GreatestHits_Gallery/PicturesVidCaps/ScanPages/051107_CBC_ShaniaALifeInEightAlbums.htm
 

Canadian biographical drama films
CBC Television original films
English-language Canadian films
Shania Twain
2005 in Canadian television
2005 television films
2005 films
Television series by Entertainment One
Films shot in Greater Sudbury
Films directed by Jerry Ciccoritti
2000s biographical films
Films set in Northern Ontario
Canadian drama television films
2000s Canadian films